Spirorbula latens is a species of air-breathing land snails, terrestrial pulmonate gastropod mollusks in the family Geomitridae, the hairy snails and their allies. 

This species is endemic to Madeira, Portugal.

References

 Bank, R. A.; Neubert, E. (2017). Checklist of the land and freshwater Gastropoda of Europe. Last update: July 16th, 2017

External links
 Lowe, R. T. (1852). Brief diagnostic notices of new Maderan land shells. The Annals and Magazine of Natural History. (2) 9 (50): 112-120; (2) 9 (52): 275-279. London

Molluscs of Madeira
Endemic fauna of Madeira
Spirorbula
Taxonomy articles created by Polbot